The Aero A.18 was a biplane fighter aircraft built in Czechoslovakia in the 1920s. It was a development of the Ae 02 and Ae 04 fighters Aero had designed during World War I, but also borrowed from the more recent A.11 reconnaissance-bomber design.

Design and development
The A.18 was designed by Antonin Vlasák and Antonin Husnik and first flew in March 1923; only one of three prototype fighters that Aero flew that year, but this one was selected for production over the A.19 and A.20 that competed with it.

Operational history
Twenty machines saw service with the Czechoslovak Air Force in the period between the wars.

The A.18B and A.18C were specially modified racing variants that competed in the Czech Aero Club's first two annual air races, in 1923 and 1924 respectively. Both aircraft won their races, and the A.18C is preserved at the Prague Aviation Museum in Kbely along with a replica of a standard A.18 fighter.

Specifications (A.18)

Operators
 Czechoslovakia

See also

References

Racing aircraft
Biplanes
Single-engined tractor aircraft
A018
1920s Czechoslovakian fighter aircraft
Aircraft first flown in 1923